Mino Doro (6 May 1903 – 13 April 1992) was an Italian actor who appeared in more than a hundred films between 1932 and 1970. Doro generally played supporting and character roles. He appeared as a blackshirt in the 1934 Fascist propaganda film The Old Guard.

In popular magazines of the 1930s, Doro was portrayed as the Italian equivalent of the American actor Clark Gable.

Selected filmography

 The Last Adventure (1932)
 T'amerò sempre (1933) - Il conte Diego
 Fanny (1933) - Mario
 Il trattato scomparso (1933) - Carlo - suo figlio
 Cento di questi giorni (1933) - Guglielmo
 The Old Guard (1934) - Roberto
 Tenebre (1934) - Emerson
 Lady of Paradise (1934) - Delfo Delfi
 Quella vecchia canaglia (1934) - Giovanni
 La fanciulla dell'altro mondo (1934) - Rigo
 Music in the Square (1936)
 The Two Sergeants (1936) - Il sergente Roberto Magni
 The Anonymous Roylott (1936)
 Doctor Antonio (1937) - Prospero
 Marcella (1937) - Renato
 Pietro Micca (1938) - Il colonello Brunet
 All of Life in One Night (1938) - Giorgio
 The Make Believe Pirates (1939)
 Piccolo hotel (1939) - Gregory Bauer
 Hurricane in the Tropics (1939) - Nichols
 Ho visto brillare le stelle (1939) - Topini
 Il segreto di Villa Paradiso (1940) - L'ispettore Gabriel Lopez
 Cuori nella tormenta (1940) - Piero Trentin
 Il re d'Inghilterra non paga (1941) - Il primo Antellesi
 Don Buonaparte (1941) - Il caporale
 Una notte dopo l'opera (1942) - Paolo Marini
 Il ponte sull'infinito (1942) - Sandro
 Redemption (1943) - Carlo
 Harlem (1943) - Bill Black
 Special Correspondents (1943) - Il giornalista Prosperi
 Non mi muovo! (1943) - Enrico Sanni, il padrone di casa
 Nessuno torna indietro (1945) - Dino Rizzi
 Monte Miracolo (1945) - Corrado Conti
 Si chiude all'alba (1945) - Il proprietario del tabarin
 The Bandit (1946) - Mirko
 Les beaux jours du roi Murat (1947) - Maghella - ministre de la police
 My Beautiful Daughter (1950) - Guidi
 Margaret of Cortona (1950) - Capitano del popolo
 Revenge of a Crazy Girl (1951) - Rodolfo
 What Price Innocence? (1952) - Massimo Artesi
 Guilt Is Not Mine (1952) - Archeologo
 Il prezzo dell'onore (1952) - Don Nicola
 The Man from Cairo (1953) - Major C. Blanc
 Frine, Courtesan of Orient (1953) - Osco
 My Life Is Yours (1953) - Il medico
 Angels of Darkness (1954)
 Il seduttore (1954)
 A Parisian in Rome (1954) - Maestro Manardi
 L'eterna femmina (1954)
 Tripoli, Beautiful Land of Love (1954) - L'eccelenza
 I cavalieri dell'illusione (1954)
 A Hero of Our Times (1955) - Prof. Bracci
 Accadde al penitenziario (1955) - Un automobilista in lite
 La ladra (1955) - Maestro Arrighi (uncredited)
 Faccia da mascalzone (1956)
 Guardia, guardia scelta, brigadiere e maresciallo (1956) - The Colonel as an Examiner
 War and Peace (1956) - Russian General (uncredited)
 Difendo il mio amore (1956)
 Nero's Weekend (1956) - Corbulone
 Allow Me, Daddy! (1956) - Il maestro Santini
 Count Max (1957) - Maj. Guido Amador
 C'è un sentiero nel cielo (1957) - Figueros, the notary public
 Ladro lui, ladra lei (1958) - Gaetano Accursio
 Slave Women of Corinth (1958) - Crepilo
 The Last Days of Pompeii (1959) - Roman Consul
 Ben-Hur (1959) - Valerius Gratus (uncredited)
 Legions of the Nile (1959) - Domiziano
 Gastone (1960) - Cavallini
 La Dolce Vita (1960) - Amante di Nadia
 Messalina (1960) - Suplicio
 Everybody Go Home (1960) - Maggiore Nocella
 Il corazziere (1960) - Il federale
 Rome 1585 (1961)
 Hercules and the Conquest of Atlantis (1961) - Oraclo
 Duel of Champions (1961) - Caius
 Hercules in the Haunted World (1961) - Keros
 A Difficult Life (1961) - Gino Laganà - Silvio's Friend
 The Police Commissioner (1962) - Col. Di Pietro
 Two Weeks in Another Town (1962) - Tucino
 The Reluctant Saint (1962)
 I Don Giovanni della Costa Azzurra (1962) - Marito di Jasmine
 8½ (1963) - L'agente di Claudia
 Duel at the Rio Grande (1963) - Don Luis
 Rocambole (1963) - L'avocat de Chateau Medy
 Il successo (1963)
 Rome Against Rome (1964) - Lutetius
 Il treno del sabato (1964) - Pallante's friend
 Panic Button (1964)
 Sandokan to the Rescue (1964) - Lumbo
 Sandokan Against the Leopard of Sarawak (1964) - Lumbo
 La mia signora (1964) - The mayor (segment "Eritrea")
 Male Companion (1964) - Le professeur Gaetano (uncredited)
 I due pericoli pubblici (1964) - Giorgio's Father
 Golia alla conquista di Bagdad (1965) - King Selim
 The Adventurer of Tortuga (1965) - Tarsarios
 Juliet of the Spirits (1965) - Player (uncredited)
 Operation Atlantis (1965) - Solis
 Fantômas se déchaîne (1965) - Le professeur suisse
 Super Seven Calling Cairo (1965) - Il Professore
 The Upper Hand (1966)
 The Mona Lisa Has Been Stolen (1966)
 To Skin a Spy (1966)
 La grande sauterelle (1967) - L'homme au bracelet de diamants
 Action Man (1967) - Luigi Savani
 Golden Chameleon (1967) - Guglielmo
 The Rover (1967) - Dussard
 Untamable Angelique (1967) - Auction director (uncredited)
 Angelique and the Sultan (1968) - (uncredited)
 3 Supermen a Tokio (1968) - Jacob Ferré
 How Did a Nice Girl Like You Get Into This Business? (1970) - Anwalt
 Hornets' Nest (1970) - Italian Doctor (final film role)

References

Bibliography 
 Forgacs, David & Gundle, Stephen. Mass Culture and Italian Society from Fascism to the Cold War. Indiana University Press, 2007.
 Landy, Marcia. The Folklore of Consensus: Theatricality in the Italian Cinema, 1930-1943. SUNY Press, 1998.

External links 

 

1903 births
1992 deaths
Italian male film actors
Actors from Venice
20th-century Italian male actors
Italian male stage actors